Antennatus drombus (freckled frogfish) is a fish of the family Antennariidae, found in the Hawaiian Islands.

Location
Antennatus drombus is endemic to the Hawaiian Islands.

Description
Antennatus drombus has a head and body usually mottled red or yellowish to reddish brown, often with numerous small dark blotches. The median and pelvic fins have dark brown to black spots.

Taxonomy
Pietsch and Grobecker (1987) synonymized A. drombus with A. coccineus, but Williams (1989) recognized it as distinct, as did Randall (1996, 2007, 2010). The two species are distinct from each other in the number of pectoral rays, as well as a color of the esca and the abundance of small dark blotches on the body and fins.

References
 

Antennariidae
Fish described in 1903